Momordin may be one of two classes of chemicals found in certain plants:
 Momordin (saponin), a derivative of the triterpenoid oleanic acid
 Momordin (protein), an enzymatic protein that inactivates ribosomes

See also
 Momordica, a plant genus that yields momordins of both kinds.